The following is a list of Special Areas of Conservation in England.

 Alde, Ore and Butley Estuaries
 Arnecliff and Park Hole Woods
 Arun Valley
 Asby Complex
 Ashdown Forest
 Aston Rowant
 Avon Gorge Woodlands
 Barnack Hills and Holes
 Baston Fen
 Bath and Bradford-on-Avon Bats
 Beast Cliff – Whitby (Robin Hood's Bay)
 Bee's Nest and Green Clay Pits
 Beer Quarry and Caves
 Benacre to Easton Bavents Lagoons
 Berwickshire and North Northumberland Coast
 Birklands and Bilhaugh
 Blackstone Point
 Blean Complex
 Bolton Fell Moss
 Border Mires, Kielder – Butterburn
 Borrowdale Woodland Complex
 Bracket's Coppice
 Braunton Burrows
 Breckland
 Bredon Hill
 Breney Common and Goss and Tregoss Moors
 Briddlesford Copses
 Brown Moss
 Burnham Beeches
 Butser Hill
 Calf Hill and Cragg Woods
 Cannock Chase
 Cannock Extension Canal
 Carrine Common
 Castle Eden Dene
 Castle Hill
 Cerne and Sydling Downs
 Chesil and the Fleet
 Chilmark Quarries
 Chilterns Beechwoods
 Clints Quarry
 Cothill Fen
 Cotswold Beechwoods
 Craven Limestone Complex
 Crookhill Brick Pit
 Crowdy Marsh
 Culm Grasslands
 Cumbrian Marsh Fritillary Site
 Dartmoor
 Dawlish Warren
 Denby Grange Colliery Ponds
 Devil's Dyke, Cambridgeshire
 Dew's Ponds
 Dixton Wood
 Dorset Heaths (Purbeck and Wareham) and Studland Dunes
 Dorset Heaths
 Dover to Kingsdown Cliffs
 Downton Gorge
 Drigg Coast
 Duddon Mosses
 Duncton to Bignor Escarpment
 Dungeness
 Durham Coast
 East Devon Pebblebed Heaths
 East Hampshire Hangers
 Ebernoe Common
 Eller's Wood and Sand Dale
 Emer Bog
 Ensor's Pool
 Epping Forest
 Essex Estuaries
 Eversden and Wimpole Woods
 Exmoor and Quantock Oakwoods
 Exmoor Heaths
 Fal and Helford
 Fen Bog
 Fenland
 Fenn's, Whixall, Bettisfield, Wem and Cadney Mosses
 Fens Pools
 Flamborough Head
 Folkestone to Etchinghill escarpment
 Fontmell and Melbury Downs
 Ford Moss
 Gang Mine
 Gibraltar Point
 Godrevy Head to St Agnes
 Great Yews
 Grimsthorpe
 Hackpen Hill
 Haig Fras
 Harbottle Moors
 Hartslock Wood
 Hastings Cliffs
 Hatfield Moor
 Helbeck and Swindale Woods
 Hestercombe House
 Holme Moor and Clean Moor
 Ingleborough Complex
 Isle of Portland to Studland Cliffs
 Isle of Wight Downs
 Isles of Scilly Complex
 Kennet and Lambourn Floodplain
 Kennet Valley Alderwoods
 Kingley Vale
 Kirk Deighton
 Lake District High Fells
 Lewes Downs (Mount Caburn)
 Little Wittenham
 Lower Bostraze and Leswidden
 Lower Derwent Valley
 Lundy
 Lydden and Temple Ewell Downs
 Lyppard Grange Ponds
 Manchester Mosses
 Marsland Valley
 Mells Valley
 Mendip Limestone Grasslands
 Mendip Woodlands
 Minsmere to Walberswick Heaths and Marshes
 Mole Gap to Reigate Escarpment
 Moor House – Upper Teesdale
 Morecambe Bay Pavements
 Morecambe Bay
 Mottey Meadows
 Mottisfont Bats
 Naddle Forest
 Nene Washes
 Newham Fen
 Newlyn Downs
 Norfolk Valley Fens
 North Downs Woodlands
 North Meadow and Clattinger Farm
 North Norfolk Coast
 North Northumberland Dunes
 North Pennine Dales Meadows
 North Pennine Moors
 North Somerset and Mendip Bats
 North York Moors
 Oak Mere
 Orfordness – Shingle Street
 Orton Pit
 Ouse Washes
 Overstrand Cliffs
 Ox Close
 Oxford Meadows
 Parkgate Down
 Paston Great Barn
 Pasturefields Salt Marsh
 Peak District Dales
 Penhale Dunes
 Peter's Pit
 Pewsey Downs
 Phoenix United Mine and Crow's Nest
 Plymouth Sound and Estuaries
 Polruan to Polperro
 Portholme
 Prescombe Down
 Quants
 Queendown Warren
 Rex Graham Reserve
 Richmond Park
 River Avon
 River Axe
 River Camel
 River Clun
 River Dee and Bala Lake
 River Derwent and Bassenthwaite Lake
 River Derwent
 River Eden
 River Ehen
 River Itchen
 River Kent
 River Lambourn
 River Mease
 River Tweed
 River Wensum
 River Wye
 Rixton Clay Pits
 Rochdale Canal
 Rodborough Common
 Roman Wall Loughs
 Rook Clift
 Rooksmoor
 Roudsea Wood and Mosses
 Roydon Common and Dersingham Bog
 Salisbury Plain
 Saltfleetby-Theddlethorpe Dunes National Nature Reserve
 Sandwich Bay
 Sefton Coast
 Shortheath Common
 Sidmouth to West Bay
 Simonside Hills
 Singleton and Cocking Tunnels
 Skipwith Common
 Solent and Isle of Wight Lagoons
 Solent Maritime
 Solway Firth
 South Dartmoor Woods
 South Devon Shore Dock
 South Hams
 South Pennine Moors
 South Solway Mosses
 South Wight Maritime
 St Albans Head to Durlston Head
 St Austell Clay Pits
 Staverton Park and The Thicks, Wantisden
 Stodmarsh
 Strensall Common
 Subberthwaite, Blawith and Torver Low Commons
 Tarn Moss
 Thanet Coast
 The Broads
 The Lizard
 The Mens
 The New Forest
 The Stiperstones and The Hollies
 The Wash and North Norfolk Coast
 Thorne Moors
 Thrislington
 Thursley, Ash, Pirbright and Chobham
 Tintagel–Marsland–Clovelly Coast
 Tregonning Hill
 Tweed Estuary
 Tyne and Allen River Gravels
 Tyne and Nent
 Ullswater Oakwoods
 Walton Moss
 Wast Water
 Waveney and Little Ouse Valley Fens
 West Dorset Alder Woods
 West Midlands Mosses
 Wimbledon Common
 Windsor Forest and Great Park
 Winterton – Horsey Dunes
 Witherslack Mosses
 Woolmer Forest
 Wormley Hoddesdonpark Woods
 Wye and Crundale Downs
 Wye Valley and Forest of Dean Bat Sites
 Wye Valley Woodlands
 Yewbarrow Woods

See also
 List of Special Areas of Conservation in Scotland
 List of Special Areas of Conservation in Wales
 List of Special Areas of Conservation in Northern Ireland

Sources
 SACs in the United Kingdom – Joint Nature Conservation Committee

 
Lists of protected areas of the United Kingdom
Special Areas of Conservation in England